Joram Metekohy (born 7 January 1983), better known by his stage name Wildstylez, is a Dutch hardstyle DJ and record producer. Having previously released hardstyle records under the alias 'Seizure', Joram Metekohy had his first solo release as Wildstylez in 2007 on the Scantraxx sub-label Scantraxx Reloaded. In 2010, he started the record label Digital:Age in collaboration with Noisecontrollers. After he stopped releasing on Digital:Age, and its subsequent collapse, Wildstylez had a string of releases on Q-Dance Records and also released many tracks for free via social media. In 2013, Wildstylez founded his own hardstyle label, Lose Control Music, under the parent label Be Yourself Music. As of 2014, he and Max Enforcer now release their own music through Lose Control Music. Later, in 2018, Wildstylez founded the label Art of Creation with Headhunterz.

Throughout his career as a hardstyle artist, Wildstylez has made numerous collaborations with other hardstyle artists, the most notable of these being the influential Project One, which he formed with Headhunterz in 2008. He has also done collaborations with other artists such as Noisecontrollers, the Prophet, Ran-D, Alpha², Max Enforcer and D-Block & S-te-Fan.

2004 – 2008
Joram Metekohy first started producing hardstyle with Ruben Hooyer in 2004 under the alias 'Seizure'. Together they had multiple releases on labels such as Sys-X Records, Blutonium Records, StraightOn Recordings and Scantraxx. In 2006, he was introduced to Scantraxx and began working on material with Alpha² that would eventually get a release on the Scantraxx sublabel Paint It Black under the name 'Outsiders'. In late 2007, having previously released on Scantraxx as Seizure, Metekohy had his first solo release as Wildstylez, "Life'z a Bitch/Missin'" on the Scantraxx sub-label run by Headhunterz, Scantraxx Reloaded.

2008 would prove to be the breakout year for Wildstylez. He had numerous releases on various Scantraxx sub-labels including Silver, Special and Reloaded and also featured on the main label. It also saw his first collaboration with one of the most popular up and coming hardstyle artists, Scantraxx Reloaded founder Headhunterz. Their first release, "Blame It on the Music/Project 1" in early 2008 proved a success and provided the impetus for the launch of a new project and debut album for the pair, Project One. Finishing in under three months producing an average of one track a week, Headhunterz and Wildstylez completed their 13-track debut album, Headhunterz & Wildstylez Present: Project One. The album was debuted in early 2008 at the Q-Dance events In Qontrol and Defqon.1, and was released shortly after on both CD and digital formats on 25 July 2008. Project One was well received in the hardstyle community with tracks such as "Life Beyond Earth", "The Art of Creation", "The Story Unfolds", Best of Both Worlds EP and "Fantasy or Reality", all proving to be successes on the dancefloor. A Project One tour followed along with 6 full-length album samplers and 1 remix sampler, all released on Scantraxx Reloaded.

2009 – 2011
2009 saw Wildstylez move away from Project One and further enhance and refine the Wildstylez sound with many well received solo releases such as "Muzic or Noize", "Phantom Beat" and "Single Sound". 2009 also saw the release of one of the most popular hardstyle songs to date, "Tonight", credited to Headhunterz & Wildstylez vs. Noisecontrollers. In 2013, "Tonight" was voted second in the Q-dance Harder Styles top 1000. 2010 saw further strong solo releases on a variety of Scantraxx sublabels, including "A Complex Situation" on Scantraxx Reloaded, "Feedback" on Scantraxx Silver, a collaboration with DJ Isaac called "Lost in Music" released on Scantraxx Special and his first appearance on the newly formed A² Records with old collaborators Alpha² with their track "Atrocious". Wildstylez also produced "No Time to Waste" for hardstyle festival Defqon.1. "No Time to Waste" was accompanied by a hardcore and dubstyle remix on release.

In 2010, Wildstylez left the Scantraxx main label and, together with Noisecontrollers, established a new hardstyle label called Digital:Age. Having worked together previously on collaborations and remixes of each other's tracks, both Wildstylez and Noisecontrollers felt they needed to leave their parent labels to take their careers to the next level.

2011 saw the first two Digital:Age releases from both Wildstylez and Noisecontrollers, titled "A Different Story" and "Stardust". Following this, Wildstylez released four solo tracks on Digital:Age, "Huh?", "Back to Basics", "Lonely" and "Into the Light". In 2012, Wildstylez produced both the Dutch and Australian Defqon.1 anthems. The Dutch anthem, "World of Madness", saw him collaborate again with Headhunterz and Noisecontrollers.

2012—present

In 2012, Wildstylez had his final release on Digital:Age and also had releases on labels A² Records, Brennan Heart Music, Q-Dance Records and a collection of self-released free tracks via social media. These free releases included the popular David Guetta – "Wild Ones (Wildstylez Bootleg)". His 2012 track with singer Niels Geusebroek, "Year of Summer", brought Wildstylez into the mainstream dance music in the Netherlands, reaching platinum status and also receiving airtime on Dutch daytime radio stations. 2012 also saw the release of "Lose My Mind", a collaboration with Brennan Heart, the video clip being the most viewed on the Wildstylez YouTube channel with over 28 million views. At the beginning of 2013, a statement from Scantraxx manager Rudy Peters confirmed that Wildstylez had indeed left the Scantraxx brand after five years, also implying that Digital:Age had been a Scantraxx affiliated label when formed. In January 2013, Wildstylez had the opportunity to host his own X-Qlusive. Held on the 19th of January at the Heineken Music Hall in the Netherlands, X-Qlusive:Wildstylez was a sold-out event and included popular hardstyle artists and former collaborators Noisecontrollers, Headhunterz and Alpha² in the lineup.

In late 2013, Wildstylez formed his own record label titled Lose Control Music. The hardstyle label was formed in partnership with Be Yourself Music, a dance related record label and management company. Wildstylez continued the trend of artists having connections with Be Yourself Music, who had also recently established similar partnerships with popular hardstyle artists Frontliner and Brennan Heart. In late 2013, Wildstylez had his first release on Lose Control Music with the single "Lights Go Out". Hardstyle producer Max Enforcer has since joined Lose Control Music, with Wildstylez having one release with him. As of 2014, Wildstylez continues to release on Lose Control Music. In 2015, a track he did together with Dutch hardstyle duo Audiotricz entitled "Turn the Music Up" was released on W&W's sublabel of Armada Music, Mainstage Music. 2016 saw Metekohy reunite with Headhunterz and play another set as Project One at Qlimax 2016. They released new music together under the Project One title, and also formed a new label called Art of Creation.

In 2017, he was chosen to create the anthem for Qlimax, "Temple of Light". 2018 brought his first collaboration with Hardwell, after remixing one of his tracks in 2013. He also released his first tracks on the Art of Creation label, his own EP and a remix for Evil Activities & Endymion.

Discography

Albums

Singles and EPs

Remixes

References

External links
Official website

1983 births
Living people
Dutch dance musicians
Dutch DJs
Dutch electronic musicians
Hardstyle musicians
People from Veenendaal
Electronic dance music DJs